Zhang Mao (277–324), courtesy name Chengxun (成遜), formally Prince Chenglie of (Former) Liang ((前)涼成烈王) (posthumous name given by Han Zhao) or Duke Cheng of Xiping (西平成公) (posthumous name used internally in Former Liang) was a ruler and the commonly accepted first ruler of the Chinese Former Liang state. (Former Liang being a state that transitioned from a Jin Dynasty governorship to an independent or semi-independent state that vacillated between being a Jin vassal and being a vassal of the stronger state controlling the Shaanxi region – Han Zhao, in Zhang Mao's case – it is difficult to define a single founding date or founder for Former Liang; but Zhang's general pardon of the people in his domain when he became ruler was considered by many historians as the sign of effective independence from Jin.) During the brief reign of his grandnephew Zhang Zuo, he was honored as Prince Cheng of Liang (涼成王).

Early career
Zhang Mao first appeared in history in 308 when his father, Zhang Gui (張軌), the first Zhang Duke of Xiping and governor of Liang Province (涼州, modern central and western Gansu), suffered a stroke and was unable to speak, and therefore had Zhang Mao act as governor during his illness. When the unrelated Zhang Yue (張越) and Cao Que (曹怯) tried to take advantage of Zhang Gui's illness to have him replaced, the Zhangs resisted and convinced the powerful Sima Mo (司馬模) the Prince of Nanyang that Zhang Gui should remain governor. At this time, Zhang Gui's oldest son and Zhang Mao's older brother Zhang Shi (張寔), who had previously been at Chang'an, returned to Liang Province and defeated and killed Cao, reaffirming the Zhangs' rule over the province.

During the subsequent governorship of Zhang Shi, Zhang Mao was one of his trusted generals. In 320, the magician Liu Hong (劉弘), who had spread rumors that the gods wished for him to be the ruler of Liang Province, convinced two of Zhang Shi's guards Yan She (閻涉) and Zhao Ang (趙卬) to assassinate Zhang Shi. Zhang Mao had Liu Hong arrested and executed by drawing and quartering. Because Zhang Shi's son Zhang Jun was still young (13 at the time), Zhang Shi's subordinates requested that Zhang Mao take over as governor and the Duke of Xiping, and he did so. He also issued a general pardon for the people in his domain – and this act is the main reason why his rule is commonly considered to mark the independence of Former Liang.

As ruler
Zhang Mao initially continued to claim to be a Jin vassal, as a governor and a duke. He appointed Zhang Jun, his nephew, as his heir. (Historical accounts are not clear whether Zhang Mao had sons of his own.) In 321, he started the construction of an impressive tower known as Lingjun Tower (靈鈞台), but after Yan Zeng (閻曾) persuaded him that it was too costly and that Zhang Gui would have disapproved, he stopped the construction.

In 322, Zhang Mao had his general Han Pu (韓璞) seize the Longxi (隴西) and Nan'an (南安, together roughly modern Dingxi, Gansu) Commanderies – which appeared to be then under nominal Han Zhao control, while Han Zhao forces were battling the rebel Chen An, extending his domain east of the Yellow River.

However, in 323, after the Han Zhao emperor Liu Yao defeated Chen An, he continued on and reached the Yellow River, claiming to be ready to cross it. Zhang went into a battle posture, but negotiated peace, agreeing to submit to Han Zhao authority and offering tributes of horses, livestock, and jewels. Liu Yao created him the Prince of Liang and granted him the nine bestowments. Subsequently, Zhang Mao resumed the construction on Lingjun Tower, stating that its construction was necessary for defensive purposes, and strengthened the defenses of the capital Guzang (姑臧, in modern Wuwei, Gansu).

In summer 324, Zhang Mao grew ill. He told his nephew Zhang Jun to remain faithful to Jin, and also ordered that he not be buried as a prince, since his princely title was not granted by the Jin emperor. He died soon thereafter.

Era name
Most historical sources indicate that Zhang Mao, like his brother Zhang Shi, continued to use Emperor Min of Jin's era name Jianxing (both to show continued allegiance to Jin and to distance himself from Emperor Yuan of Jin and his line) but some sources indicate that he changed era name to Yongguang (永光 yǒng guāng 320–323).  A current theory is that his era name was used internally while the Jianxing era name was used when communicating with other states.

Notes

References

4th-century Chinese monarchs
Monarchs of Former Liang
Former Zhao people
277 births
324 deaths
Chinese princes
Founding monarchs